Euchomenella is a genus of mantids  and typical of the tribe Euchomenellini.  Current records are from Vietnam and Borneo.

Species
The Mantodea Species File currently lists:
 Euchomenella adwinae Vermeersch, 2018
 Euchomenella apicalis Werner, 1922
 Euchomenella heteroptera de Haan, 1842 (type species)
 Euchomenella macrops Saussure, 1870
 Euchomenella matilei Roy, 2001
 Euchomenella moluccarum Saussure, 1872
 Euchomenella thoracica de Haan, 1842
 Euchomenella udovichenkoi Shcherbakov, 2012

References

External links
Pictures on Up Close with Nature blog
 
 

Mantodea genera
Deroplatyinae